Indian pennywort is a common name for several plants and may refer to:

Bacopa monnieri
Centella asiatica
Oenanthe javanica